The Ionian Islands Region is the smallest by area of the thirteen administrative regions of Greece located in the Ionian Sea. It comprises all the Ionian Islands except Kythera, which, although historically part of the island group, was separated and integrated to the Attica Region.

Demographics

The population of the Ionian Islands in 2011 was 207,855, decreased by 1.5% compared to the population in 2001. Nevertheless, the region remains the third by population density with 90.1/km2 nationwide, well above the national of 81.96/km2. The most populous of the major islands is Corfu with a population of 104,371, followed by Zante (40,759), Cephalonia (35,801), Leucas (23,693) and Ithaca (3,231). In 2001, the foreign-born population was 19,360 or 9.3%, the majority of which was concentrated in Corfu and Zante. Most of them originate from Albania (13,536). The fertility rate for 2011 according to Eurostat was 1.35 live births per woman.

Economy
The regional gross domestic product for 2010 was 4,029 million euros. The GDP per capita for the same year was 18,440 euros per capita which was lower than the national median of 20,481. However, the GDP per capita of Cephalonia and Zante, 23,275 and 24,616 respectively, was much higher than the national figure. Additionally, unemployment for 2012 was 14.7, the lowest among all Greek regions, and much lower compared to the national unemployment of 24.2.

Tourism

The region is a popular tourist destination. The airports of Corfu, Zante and Cephalonia were in the top ten in Greece by number of international arrivals, with 1,386,289 international arrivals for 2012, with Corfu being the sixth airport by number of arrivals nationwide, while Zante and Cephalonia also being in the top ten. Cephalonia Airport had the biggest increase nationwide by 13.11% compared to 2011, while Corfu had an increase of 6.31%.

Administration
The region was established in the 1987 administrative reform, comprising the prefectures of Corfu, Kefalonia and Ithaca, Lefkada and Zakynthos.

With the 2010 Kallikratis plan, its powers and authority were redefined and extended. Along with West Greece and Peloponnese regions, it is supervised by the Decentralized Administration of the Peloponnese, West Greece and the Ionian Islands based at Patras. The region is based at Corfu and is divided into 5 regional units:

Corfu (Kerkyra)
Ithaca (Ithaki)
Kefalonia
Lefkada
Zakynthos

Historical population

References

External links

  

 
States and territories established in 1987
Administrative regions of Greece
Traditional geographic divisions of Greece
1987 establishments in Greece